Éric Dupont (born June 16, 1970) is a Canadian writer from Quebec. His 2006 novel La Logeuse was the winner of the 2008 edition of Le Combat des livres, and his 2012 novel La fiancée américaine was a competing title in the 2013 edition of the program; the latter novel's English translation, Songs for the Cold of Heart, was shortlisted for the 2018 Scotiabank Giller Prize.

Dupont was born and raised in Amqui, Quebec, and studied at Carleton University, the Free University of Berlin, the Université de Montréal and the University of Toronto. In addition to his writing career, he teaches English to French translation and continuing education courses at McGill University.

Writing career
His debut novel, Voleurs de sucre, was published in 2005, and won the Prix Senghor and the Prix Jovette-Bernier. Its English translation, Sugar Thieves, was issued in 2012.

La Logeuse, his second novel, was published in 2006. It was defended by journalist Nicolas Langelier in the 2008 edition of Le Combat des livres, winning the competition.

His third novel, Bestiaire, followed in 2008. Its English translation, Life in the Court of Matane, appeared in 2016 as the first title ever published by QC Fiction, a publishing house which specializes in English translations of Québécois literature. La fiancée américaine followed in 2012, with its English translation Songs for the Cold of Heart following in 2018. In addition to its Giller Prize nomination the novel's translator, Peter McCambridge, was shortlisted for the Governor General's Award for French to English translation at the 2018 Governor General's Awards.

His newest novel, La route du lilas, was published in 2018.

Bibliography
Voleurs de sucre, 2005 (Sugar Thieves, 2012)
La Logeuse, 2006
Bestiaire, 2008 (Life in the Court of Matane, 2016)
La fiancée américaine, 2012 (Songs for the Cold of Heart, 2018)
La route du lilas, 2018

References 

21st-century Canadian novelists
21st-century Canadian male writers
Canadian male novelists
Canadian novelists in French
Carleton University alumni
Université de Montréal alumni
University of Toronto alumni
Academic staff of McGill University
Writers from Quebec
Living people
1970 births